Rahimabad (also Romanized as Raḩīmābād) is a village in Dorudfaraman Rural District, in the Central District of Kermanshah County, Kermanshah Province, Iran. At the 2006 census, its population was 583, in 137 families.

References 

Populated places in Kermanshah County